The Torrance Transit Center (officially the Mary K. Giordano Regional Transit Center) is planned a bus station in Torrance that will serve as the city's transport hub. It is expected to open in Spring 2023. The station is planned to serve as the southern terminus of the Los Angeles Metro Rail C Line via a proposed extension.

History
The previous bus hub in Torrance, located at the Del Amo Fashion Center, ceased operation in 2005. Design and contracting of the new facility was rebooted in 2013 as initial designs did not adequately facilitate riders' needs. Ground was broken for the station in 2018.

Service
The Torrance Transit routes that will serve the new Torrance Transit Center are: Lines 1, R3, 4, 5, 6, 10, and 10X.

References 

Bus stations in Los Angeles County, California
Buildings and structures in Torrance, California
Transportation in Torrance, California